The Cripple of Inishmaan is a dark comedy by Martin McDonagh who links the story to the real life filming of the documentary Man of Aran.

The play is set on the small Aran Islands community of Inishmaan (Inis Meáin) off the Western Coast of Ireland in 1934, where the inhabitants are excited to learn of a Hollywood film crew's arrival in neighbouring Inishmore (Inis Mór) to make a documentary about life on the islands.  "Cripple" Billy Claven, eager to escape the gossip, poverty and boredom of Inishmaan, vies for a part in the film, and to everyone's surprise, the orphan and outcast gets his chance.... or so some believe.

Synopsis 
"Cripple" Billy Claven is a disabled orphan living with his aunts Kate and Eileen Osbourne on the Irish island of Inishmaan. He is regularly ridiculed by the locals for his condition and odd habits, in particular his crush Helen, and is the subject of a rumor that his parents tried to kill him as a baby before they themselves died. The only people who show him any sympathy are his personal doctor McSharry and Johnnypateenmike, the town gossip who is attempting to help his alcoholic mother drink herself to death to collect her insurance.

One day, Billy learns that American filmmaker Robert Flaherty is on a neighboring island filming a documentary about life on the local islands. Desperate to escape the toxic needling of the community, who believe his involvement in the documentary is nothing more than a pipe dream, Billy manipulates local fisherman Bobby Bennet into believing he contracted a similar case of tuberculosis that his wife had in order to go to the filming. Bobby later informs Kate and Eileen that Billy drowned while returning to town, much to their shock.

The news of Billy's apparent death shakes up the small community. Kate and Eileen become despondent over what happened; Helen becomes more aggressive, and regularly takes it out on her younger brother Bartley; Johnny feels that his gossip giving has no purpose now that his best listener is gone. Fortunately, Billy miraculously returns during a showing of the documentary, having told Bobby to fake his death because he had been picked up by the American producers for another film, an opportunity that, ultimately, didn't pan out like he hoped. Unfortunately, the mood is soured when Bobby, having realized Billy's deception, severely beats him with a pipe, despite McSharry confirming moments later that he might have contracted TB prior to traveling stateside. Billy is further demoralized when, despite Johnny's attempt to spin a romantic story about his parents' deaths, he overhears his aunts confirming that his parents died trying to kill him, and Johnny had been fronting the money for his medical expenses the whole time. His mood is lifted slightly when Helen agrees to a date in the middle of the night in order to preserve her reputation, ending the play there.

Productions 

The Cripple of Inishmaan opened on 12 December 1996 at Royal National Theatre (Cottesloe) in London. In April 1998, it opened Off-Broadway at the Joseph Papp Public Theater, again with Ruaidhri Conroy in the title role. In the same year, Frederick Koehler played Billy in Los Angeles.

The play was produced Off-Broadway by the Atlantic Theater Company in conjunction with The Druid Theatre Company of Galway, Ireland, opening on 21 December 2008. Directed by Garry Hynes, the cast featured Kerry Condon, Andrew Connolly, Laurence Kinlan, Dearbhla Molloy, Aaron Monaghan, Marie Mullen, Patricia O'Connell, David Pearse and John C. Vennema.

In 2013 the play returned to the Noël Coward Theatre in London's West End for a sold-out run starring Daniel Radcliffe as Cripple Billy and with Michael Grandage directing. In spring 2014, this production transferred to Broadway at the Cort Theatre for a limited run, with Opening Night on 20 April 2014.

Critique 

Martin McDonagh said of his play, "I hope someday they’ll be regarded as true Irish stories; I don’t think they are at this minute. It will take a long time for the baggage of me being a Londoner to be in the past."

In an interview, after the play was performed on Inishmaan in 2011, it was reported that "Mr. McDonagh used an unprintable euphemism to explain that it has never been his intent to take the measure of his fellow Irishmen cruelly".

Characters 

 Billy Claven, disabled orphan
 Kate Osbourne, Billy's adoptive aunt (known to talk to stones)
 Eileen Osbourne, Billy's other adoptive aunt and Kate's sister (is known to hide candy)
 Johnnypateenmike, the town gossip
 Helen McCormick, a tough girl Billy has had a crush on for some time
 Bartley McCormick, Helen's brother (the village idiot)
 Babbybobby Bennett, a boatman whose wife died of tuberculosis
 Doctor McSharry, the town doctor
 Mammy O'Dougal, Johnny's alcoholic 90-year-old mother (is trying to drink herself dead)

Awards and nominations
The 2014 Broadway production received six 2014 Tony Award nominations: Best Revival of a Play, Best Performance by an Actress in a Featured Role in a Play (Sarah Greene), Best Scenic Design of a Play (Christopher Oram), Best Lighting Design of a Play
(Paule Constable), Best Sound Design of a Play (Alex Baranowski) and Best Direction of a Play (Michael Grandage).

Book 
 McDonagh, Martin. The Cripple of Inishmaan. Methuen Modern Plays. 1997. (Hardcover) 
 McDonagh, Martin. The Cripple of Inishmaan. Vintage International. 1998. (Paperback)

References

External links
 

1996 plays
Plays by Martin McDonagh
Plays set in Ireland
Plays set in the 1930s